Close to the Ground is an original novel based on the U.S. television series Angel.

Plot summary
After saving a young woman from her rogue bodyguards, Angel is hired by a big Hollywood studio head, Jack Willitts, to guard the girl in question; his daughter, Karinna. Angel is persuaded when his co-workers point out there is rent to deal with, and Cordelia even convinces Jack to give her a job (Unfortunately, it is as a tour guide rather than an actress).

Angel takes Karinna to several popular nightspots, writing her off as a spoiled brat. Cordelia believes Angel is getting too close to the case, but the situation soon worsens. Karinna gets into trouble while Angel and company are being tracked by an unknown creature, trying to destroy anything getting in its way.

Angel eventually finds himself trapped in a supernatural struggle for power and immortality, as an Irish magician, Mordractus, reveals that he has been tracking Angel. Mordractus is attempting to summon a powerful demon, but the spells are draining his life energy, and he will soon die unless a way of surviving is found. Knowing that Angel is immortal, yet retaining a soul, Mordractus attempts to steal Angel's 'essence' to allow him to duplicate that feat, but Angel escapes and Mordractus is banished to Hell.

Continuity
Supposed to be set early in Angel season 1, before the episode "Hero".
Angel reflects he made the decision to help people in 1898 after seeing a vampire kill a woman he tried to protect; this is contradicted by flashbacks in "Darla", but Angel might be lying to himself, or he may have simply changed his mind between the flashback here and the events depicted in flashbacks in "Darla".
Characters include Angel, Cordelia Chase, Allen Francis Doyle, Kate Lockley.

Canonical issues

Angel books such as this one are not usually considered by fans as canonical. Some fans consider them stories from the imaginations of authors and artists, while other fans consider them as taking place in an alternative fictional reality. However unlike fan fiction, overviews summarising their story, written early in the writing process, were 'approved' by both Fox and Joss Whedon (or his office), and the books were therefore later published as officially Buffy/Angel merchandise.

External links

Reviews
Litefoot1969.bravepages.com - Review of this book by Litefoot 
Teen-books.com - Reviews of this book
Shadowcat.name - Review of this book

Angel (1999 TV series) novels
2000 fantasy novels
Novels by Jeff Mariotte